Lionel Jeffrey Sams (born 20 January 1961 in Paddington, London) is a former English darts player who previously played in the Professional Darts Corporation (PDC) tournaments. His nickname was The Lion for his matches. Since 2011, he played for the British Darts Organisation (BDO).

Sams' first televised darts match was on Anglia Television in 1986 at the Ladbrokes Festival (British Matchplay). He reached the final, but lost to Terry O'Dea. He then had some minor tournament victories including the Camber Sands Singles (1988) and Kent Open (1988 and 1989) but it was a long time before he made any impact on the darts circuit.

Professional Darts Corporation career
His career turned for the better after joining the PDC. He hit a perfect nine-dart leg in a match against Ronnie Baxter in Montreal in May 2002 – there was no prize for the achievement, but players passed round a hat to collect $400. He qualified for the PDC World Championship for the first time in 2004 and beat Roland Scholten before losing to Simon Whatley in the last 16. 

Sams consistently reached the last 16 of tournaments on the PDC circuit, which helped him to maintain a world ranking inside the top 32. He was seeded 16th in 2006 and 22nd in 2007 for the World Championship as a result.

Sams was successful at the West Tyrone Open in February 2007, winning the singles and the doubles event, with Sean McGowan.

Career decline
Sams' record at the World Championship has been poor since reaching the last 16 in 2004 and he lost his first match at each of the 2005, 2006 and 2007 Championships. He also failed to achieve success in the other televised tournaments, being unable to reach the quarter-final stage of any of the majors. He slipped outside the top 32 towards the end of 2007, and as a result, he inadvertently failed to enter himself for the qualifying rounds for the 2008 World Championship, missing out on the tournament for the first time since 2003. He has failed to qualify for the PDC World Championship since 2007. 

During 2009, he reached two quarter finals on the PDC Pro Tour, but ended the year with only £6,100 in total prize money. He had a further decline in 2010, picking up just £600 in total prize money, as he entered fewer events and then failed to get past the last 64 stage of any Pro Tour Event. His PDC ranking fell to near 100 at the start of 2011 and he chose to decline a Pro Tour card for the year, effectively ending his PDC career. He joined the British Darts Organisation circuit in 2011.

World Championship Results

PDC

2004: 4th Round (lost to Simon Whatley 1–4) (sets)
2005: 3rd Round (lost to Dennis Priestley 1–4)
2006: 1st Round (lost to John Kuczynski 0–3)
2007: 1st Round (lost to Dave Ladley 1–3)

References

External links
 Lionel Sams' website
 Lionel Sams' profile and statistics on Darts Database

1961 births
English darts players
Living people
People from Paddington
British Darts Organisation players
Professional Darts Corporation former tour card holders